The siege of Louisbourg was a pivotal operation of the Seven Years' War (known in the United States as the French and Indian War) in 1758 that ended the French colonial era in Atlantic Canada and led to the subsequent British campaign to capture Quebec in 1759 and the remainder of French North America the following year.

Background
The British government realized that with the Fortress of Louisbourg under French control, the Royal Navy could not sail up the St. Lawrence River unmolested for an attack on Quebec. After an expedition against Louisbourg in 1757 led by Lord Loudon was turned back due to a strong French naval deployment, the British under the leadership of William Pitt resolved to try again with new commanders.

Pitt assigned the task of capturing the fortress to Major General Jeffery Amherst. Amherst's brigadiers were Charles Lawrence, James Wolfe and Edward Whitmore, and command of naval operations was assigned to Admiral Edward Boscawen.  The chief engineer was John Henry Bastide who had been present at the first siege of Louisbourg in 1745 and was chief engineer at Fort St Philip, Minorca, in 1756 when the British had surrendered the fort and island to the French after a long siege.

As they had in 1757, the French planned to defend Louisbourg by means of a large naval build-up. However, the British blockaded the French fleet sailing from Toulon when it arrived in Cartagena, and defeated a French relief force at the Battle of Cartagena.

The French consequently abandoned their attempt to reinforce Louisbourg from the Mediterranean, and only 11 ships were available to oppose the British off Louisbourg. Most of the cannons and men were moved inside the fort and five ships (Appolon, Fidèle, Chèvre, Biche, Diane) were sunk to block the entrance to the harbour.
On 9 July, Echo tried to slip out of the harbour under the cover of a dense fog, but was intercepted and seized by
HMS Scarborough and HMS Junon. This left the French with only five half-empty ships in the harbour : Célèbre (64), Entreprenant (74), Capricieux (64), Prudent (74) and Bienfaisant (64).

British forces assembled at Halifax, Nova Scotia where army and navy units spent most of May training together as the massive invasion fleet came together. After a large gathering at the Great Pontack, on 29 May, the Royal Navy fleet departed from Halifax for Louisbourg.

Order of battle

The fleet consisted of 150 transport ships and 40 men-of-war.  Housed in these ships were almost 14,000 soldiers, almost all of whom were regulars (with the exception of four companies of American rangers).  The force was divided into three divisions:  Red, commanded by James Wolfe, Blue, commanded by Charles Lawrence and White commanded by Edward Whitmore.  On 2 June the British force anchored in Gabarus Bay,  from Louisbourg.

The French commander (and governor of Île-Royale (New France)), the Chevalier de Drucour, had at his disposal some 3,500 regulars as well as approximately 3,500 marines and sailors from the French warships in the harbour. However, unlike the previous year, the French navy was unable to assemble in significant numbers, leaving the French squadron at Louisbourg outnumbered five to one by the British fleet.  Drucour ordered trenches to be prepared and defended by some 2,000 French troops, along with other defences, such as an artillery battery, at Kennington Cove.

British forces

British forces were commanded by General Jeffery Amherst (appx. 11,000 regulars and 200 American rangers (colonials)).
 3 companies of Rogers' Rangers
 Gorham's Rangers (only 1 company) – Colonial Massachusetts
 Louisbourg Grenadiers (composite, made up of grenadiers from the 22nd, 45th, and 40th regiments)
 Commander Artillery & Engineers
 Captain Ord's Company, Royal Artillery
 11 Miners
 11 Engineers
 100 Carpenters
 Royal Train of Artillery (324 men)
 Brigadier Whitmore's Brigade under Brigadier General Edward Whitmore
 1st Battalion, 1st Regiment of Foot
 22nd Regiment of Foot
 40th Regiment of Foot
 48th Regiment of Foot
 3rd Battalion, 60th (Royal American) Regiment of Foot
 Brigadier Wolfe's Brigade under Brigadier General James Wolfe
 17th Regiment of Foot
 35th Regiment of Foot
 47th Regiment of Foot
 2nd Battalion, 60th (Royal American) Regiment of Foot
 Brigadier Lawrence's Brigade under Brigadier General Charles Lawrence
 15th Regiment of Foot
 28th Regiment of Foot
 45th Regiment of Foot
 58th Regiment of Foot
 78th Regiment (Fraser's Highlanders)

French forces

Ground troops
The French garrison based within the Fortress of Louisbourg was commanded by Augustin de Boschenry, Chevalier de Drucour.  Between 1755 and the time of the siege, the French garrison expanded from 1,200 troops to around 6,000 troops.  Troops forming the garrison included:
 2nd Battalion, Regiment of Artois — 2éme Bataillon du Régiment d'Artois (520 Troops)
 2nd Battalion, Regiment of Burgundy — 2éme Bataillon du Régiment de Bourgogne (520 Troops)
 2nd Battalion, Regiment of Cambis — 2éme Bataillon du Régiment de Cambis (650 Troops), Battalion arriving just before the siege, based in Port-Dauphin and marched to Louisbourg due to the town being blockaded by the Royal Navy
 2nd Battalion, Regiment of Foreign Volunteers — 2éme Bataillon du Régiment des Volontaires Étrangers (660 Troops0
 1,000 Compagnies Détachées (mostly from the Compagnies Franches de la Marine)
 120 gunners from Bombardiers de la Marine
 700 "burgher militia"
 Tribe of unknown Natives
 Crews from the French fleet

Naval forces & reinforcements
Many naval forces were sent from France to Louisbourg, but the majority of them didn't arrive in time.  The divisions and squadrons sent to assist included:
 Naval Division of the Marquis Charry des Gouttes (departed from Île-d'Aix on 9 March, arrival date in Louisbourg unknown)
 74 Gun Ship-of-the-Line Prudent — Captured then set on fire 26 July
 64 Gun SoL Raisonnable — Collided with Messager on 13 March, captured after a brief fight 29 April
 56 Gun SoL L'Apollon, only 20 or 22 cannons — Scuttled 28 June
 24 Gun Frigate Diane — Scuttled 29 June
 24 Gun Frigate Mutine — Fate unknown
 24 Gun Frigate Fidèle — Scuttled 28 June
 24 Gun Frigate Galatée — Captured in April by the English as it left Bordeaux, escorting a convoy of twelve transports to supply the town but all captured
 6 or 12 Gun Fluyt Messager — Collided 13 March with Raisonnable probably later returned to Rochefort
 10 Gun Fluyt Chèvre — Scuttled 28 June
 Naval Division of Beaussier de l'Isle (departed Brest 10 April, unknown arrival date)
 74 Gun Ship-of-the-Line Entreprenant — Burned 21 July during the siege by flaming debris projected by the explosion of Celebre
 64 Gun SoL Bizarre — Left Louisbourg on 8 June to help during the siege of Quebec to bring food and ammunition and joined Du Chaffault division.  Separated from other ships on 24 September on return, returned to France alone, docked in Lorient
 64 Gun SoL Célèbre — Exploded 21 July after being hit by English bomb during siege
 64 Gun SoL Capricieux — Exploded 21 July by flaming debris from the explosion of Célèbre
 64 Gun SoL Bienfaisant — Captured during the night of 25/26 July during raid, integrated into Royal Navy
 30 Gun Frigate Comtète — Left Louisbourg at start of the siege, then returned to France alone
 28 Gun Frigate L'Echo — Sent to Quebec to advise arrival of the English squadron in front of Louisbourg, captured by two English frigates on 25 May

Siege
Weather conditions in the first week of June made any landing impossible and the British were only able to mount a bombardment of the improvised shore defences of Gabarus Bay from a frigate.  However, conditions improved, and at daybreak on 8 June Amherst launched his assault using a flotilla of large boats, organized in seven divisions, each commanded by one of his brigadiers.  French defences were initially successful and after heavy losses, Wolfe ordered a retreat.  However, at the last minute, a boatload of light infantry in Wolfe's division (i.e., members of Rogers Rangers) found a rocky inlet protected from French fire and secured a beachhead.  Wolfe redirected the rest of his division to follow.  Outflanked, the French retreated rapidly back to their fortress.

Continuing heavy seas and the difficulty inherent to moving siege equipment over boggy terrain delayed the commencement of the formal siege. In the meantime, Wolfe was sent with 1,220 picked men around the harbour to seize Lighthouse Point, which dominated the harbour entrance.  This he did on 12 June.  After eleven days, on 19 June, the British artillery batteries were in position and the orders were given to open fire on the French.  The British battery consisted of seventy cannons and mortars of all sizes.  Within hours, the guns had destroyed walls and damaged several buildings.
On 21 July a mortar round from a British gun on Lighthouse Point struck a 64-gun French ship of the line, Le Célèbre , and set it ablaze. A stiff breeze fanned the fire, and shortly after Le Célèbre caught fire, two other French ships, L'Entreprenant and Le Capricieux, had also caught fire. L'Entreprenant sank later in the day, depriving the French of the largest ship in the Louisbourg fleet.

The next major blow to French morale came on the evening of 23 July, at 10:00.  A British "hot shot" set the King's Bastion on fire.  The King's Bastion was the fortress headquarters and the largest building in North America in 1758. Its destruction eroded confidence and reduced morale in the French troops and their hopes to lift the British siege.

Naval action
Most historians regard the British actions of 25 July as the "straw that broke the camel's back". Using a thick fog as cover, Admiral Boscawen sent a cutting-out party to destroy the last two French ships in the harbour. The British raiders eliminated these two French ships of the line, capturing  and burning Prudent, thus clearing the way for the Royal Navy to enter the harbour. James Cook, who later became famous as an explorer, took part in this operation and recorded it in his ship's log book.

Capitulation
On 26 July the French surrendered.  Having fought a spirited defence, the French expected to be accorded the honours of war, as they had given to the surrendering British at the Battle of Minorca.  However, Amherst refused, tales of the atrocities supposedly committed by France's native allies at the surrender of Fort Oswego and Fort William Henry probably fresh in his mind. The defenders of Louisbourg were ordered to surrender all of their arms, equipment and flags. These actions outraged Drucour, but because the safety of the non-combatant inhabitants of Louisbourg depended upon him he reluctantly accepted the terms of surrender. The Cambis regiment refused to honour the terms of surrender, breaking its muskets and burning its regimental flags rather than hand them over to the British victors. Brigadier-General Whitmore was appointed the new Governor of Louisbourg, and remained there with four regiments.

Aftermath
Louisbourg had held out long enough to prevent an attack on Quebec in 1758. However the fall of the fortress led to the loss of French territory across Atlantic Canada.  From Louisbourg, British forces spent the remainder of the year routing French forces and occupying French settlements in what is today New Brunswick, Prince Edward Island and Newfoundland. The second wave of the Acadian expulsion began. The British engaged in the St. John River Campaign, the Cape Sable Campaign, the Petitcodiac River Campaign, the Ile Saint-Jean Campaign, and the removal of Acadians in the Gulf of St. Lawrence Campaign (1758).

The loss of Louisbourg deprived New France of naval protection, opening the Saint Lawrence to attack. Louisbourg was used in 1759 as the staging point for General Wolfe's famous siege of Quebec ending French rule in North America. Following the surrender of Quebec, British forces and engineers set about methodically destroying the fortress with explosives, ensuring that it could not return to French possession a second time in any eventual peace treaty. By 1760, the entire fortress was reduced to mounds of rubble. In 1763 the Treaty of Paris saw France formally cede Canada, including Cape Breton Island, to the British. In 1768 the last of the British garrison departed along with most of the remaining civilian inhabitants.

Royal Navy fleet throughout the siege

See also

 France in the Seven Years War
 Great Britain in the Seven Years War
 Louisburgh, County Mayo, a town named after the battle
 Military history of Nova Scotia
 Louisbourg Garrison

References
Primary sources
 Gordon's journal of the siege
 The Daily Journals, Diaries, Letters, and Accounts of Louisbourg and Isle Royale (1713–1768)
 Journal of John Wolcott
 Memoirs of de Johnstone
 Chapter III of The Interesting Narrative of the Life of Olaudah Equiano, or Gustavus Vassa, the African at Wikisource includes a brief witness account of the battle
 Guerre du Canada. 1756–1760. Montcalm et Lévis.(in French)
Endnotes

Bibliography

 Anderson, Fred. Crucible of War (2000) pp 250–256
 Brumwell, Stephen. Paths of Glory: The Life and Death of General James Wolfe. Hambledon Continuum, 2007 
 Chartrand, Rene Louisbourg 1758 
 Hough, Richard. Captain James Cook: a biography. Hodder & Stoughton, 1995
 Fowler, William M. Empires at War: The French and Indian War and the Struggle For North America.  Vancouver: Douglas & McIntyre Ltd., 2005
 Hitsman, J.  McKay and C.C.J. Bond.  "The Assault Landing at Louisbourg, 1758," Canadian Historical Review (1954) 35:314–330.
 A.J.B. Johnson, Endgame 1758:The Promise, the Glory and the Despair of Louisbourg's Last Decade, Sydney, NS: Capre Breton University Press, 2008
 McLennan, J.S (2000, originally 1918). Louisbourg: From its Foundation to its Fall, 1713–1758. Halifax: The Book Room Limited.
 Warner, Oliver.  With Wolfe to Quebec. Toronto: William Collins Sons and Company Ltd., 1972 
 

 James Cook's participation at the Siege of Louisbourg. Royal Geographical Society of South Australia

Conflicts in Acadia
Military history of New England
Military history of the Thirteen Colonies
Conflicts in New Brunswick
Acadian history
Sieges involving France
Sieges involving Great Britain
Battles of the French and Indian War
1758 in France
Conflicts in 1758
1758 in Canada
Conflicts in Nova Scotia
Amphibious operations involving the United Kingdom